The Krewe of Endymion is a New Orleans Mardi Gras super krewe and social organization.

History and formation 

The Krewe of Endymion is one of only three Super Krewes (using floats and celebrity Grand Marshals), and is the largest of the parades participating in the New Orleans Mardi Gras. Many people begin saving their viewing spots for this parade several days before the parade actually rolls, although spot-saving is widely frowned upon and is discouraged. It was founded in 1966 and named after Endymion {en-dim'-ee-uhn}, from Greek mythology. The first ball was held in 1968.

Parade

The first Endymion parade rolled on February 4, 1967 in the Gentilly neighborhood near the New Orleans Fair Grounds horse racing facility. The parade remained on its original route until 1976, when it was shifted to its now traditional Mid-City route, rolling from Orleans Avenue to North Carrollton Avenue to Canal Street and into the Caesar's Superdome.

The 1979 parade was moved to the Jefferson Parish suburb of Kenner due to a strike by the New Orleans Police Department which forced the cancellation of a large number of parades within the city, including fellow super krewe Bacchus and all of the old-line parades, led by Rex, King of Carnival and the Mistick Krewe of Comus.

The 2003 parade was forced to the Uptown route along St. Charles Avenue by construction of the Canal Streetcar Line, a circumstance which repeated in 2006 and 2007 due to a lack of manpower within the NOPD in the wake of Hurricane Katrina. Endymion returned to Mid-City in 2008 and is the only remaining parade in the New Orleans city limits which does not use the Uptown route.

On February 25, 2017, an impaired driver injured between 28 and 32 people when his pickup truck hit two cars and a parade crowd and crashed into a dump truck. Terrorism was quickly ruled out when a breathalyzer test was three times over the legal driving limit.

On March 2, 2019, an impaired driver killed two people and injured seven others when he plowed through a bicycle lane during the parade.

On February 22, 2020, the parade was halted and cancelled after 13 floats, after a spectator was struck and killed between the halves of a tandem float. Following the incident, as well as a similar death during the Nyx parade earlier in the week, the city of New Orleans banned interconnected floats from the remaining Mardi Gras parades that year. Parades were canceled in 2021 due to the Covid-19 pandemic. As parades resume in 2022, the city may require further safety measures surrounding tandem floats.

Celebrity Grand Marshals and Performers

New Orleans Saints owner Tom Benson was Grand Marshal of the 2010 parade only six days following his franchise's victory in Super Bowl XLIV over the Indianapolis Colts. Benson was the first celebrity Grand Marshal not from the entertainment industry. 

The parade was not held in 2021; it was planned the next year for Saturday February 26, 2022, before Mardi Gras on Tuesday March 1, 2022.

Throws 
Its motto, "Throw Until It Hurts", defines a tradition of being extremely generous with its throws, tossing millions of beads, cups, doubloons and trinkets during its annual parade, held the Saturday before Mardi Gras.

Parade Theme

Unlike many other Carnival Krewes, Endymion announces the season theme months prior to Mardi Gras.

Parade Themes

Endymion Extravaganza

The parade is immediately followed with a party called the Endymion Extravaganza. It was held from 1974 to 1980 at the now demolished Rivergate Convention Center. Since 1981, it has been held in the Mercedes-Benz Superdome, except in 2006 when it was held at the New Orleans Morial Convention Center due to repairs to the Superdome after Hurricane Katrina and also in 2011 due to its final renovations. The Krewe returned to the Superdome in 2012. During the 2010s, the Krewe has had over 3000 members and over 20,000 guests at its Extravaganza.

References 

http://www.nola.com/crime/index.ssf/2017/10/endymion_crash_driver_sentence.html

External links

Endymion website

Mardi Gras in New Orleans
1966 establishments in Louisiana